Rezaqoli-ye Qeshlaqi (also Romanized as Reẕāqolī-ye Qeshlāqī; also known as Reẕāqolī Qeshlāq) is a village in Rezaqoli-ye Qeshlaq Rural District, in the Central District of Nir County, Ardabil Province, Iran. At the 2006 census, its population was 232, in 53 families.

References 

Towns and villages in Nir County